Inga Muscio (born c. 1966) is an American feminist, writer and public speaker. Her books include Cunt: A Declaration of Independence (1998) and Rose: Love in Violent Times (2010).

Work

Muscio's book, Cunt: A Declaration of Independence (Seal Press, 1998), calls for women to break down boundaries between themselves, their bodies, and each other.

Her book Autobiography of a Blue-Eyed Devil: My Life and Times in a Racist Imperialist Society (Seal Press, 2005) examines and critiques white privilege, racism, and colonialism among other issues.

Her third book, Rose: Love in Violent Times (Seven Stories Press, 2010), examines the presence of passive and physical violence in our daily lives and describes how we might find love within this violence.

Personal life 
She currently resides in Seattle Washington.

References

External links

Inga Muscio interview for SexIs

1960s births
American essayists
Living people
People from Santa Maria, California
Evergreen State College alumni
Writers from Seattle
Feminist artists
American feminist writers
Third-wave feminism